Schellenberger is a surname of German origin. Notable people with the surname include: 

Bernardin Schellenberger (born 1944), German theologian
Dagmar Schellenberger (born 1958), German operatic soprano
Gary Schellenberger (born 1943), Canadian politician
Hansjörg Schellenberger (born 1948), German oboist and conductor
Kenneth Schellenberger (born 1948), Canadian politician
Raphaël Schellenberger (born 1990), French politician

See also
Shellenberger
Schellenberg
Shallenberger

Surnames
Surnames of German origin
German-language surnames